Boevange is a village in the commune of Wincrange, in northern Luxembourg.  , the village had a population of 117.

Boevange was a commune in the canton of Clervaux until 1 January 1978, when it was merged with the communes of Asselborn, Hachiville, and Oberwampach to form the new commune of Wincrange.  The law creating Wincrange was passed on 31 October 1977.

Former commune
The former commune consisted of the villages:

 Boevange
 Deiffelt
 Doennange
 Hamiville
 Crendal
 Lullange
 Troine
 Wincrange
 Lentzweiler - partly shared with the former commune of Asselborn
 Hinterhasselt (lieu-dit)
 Antoniushof (lieu-dit)
 Troine-Route (lieu-dit)

Footnotes

Villages in Luxembourg
Wincrange
Former communes of Luxembourg